The Blamey Stakes is a Victoria Racing Club Group 2  Thoroughbred horse race for three years old and older, with Set Weights with Penalties conditions over 1600 metres, at Flemington Racecourse, Melbourne, Australia in March during the VRC Autumn Racing Carnival.  The total prize money is A$300,000.

History
 
The race is named after Sir Thomas Albert Blamey, who was Australia's only native born Field marshal and was a Victoria Racing Club Committee member from 1947 until his death in 1951.

The race has been won by horses of exceptional calibre that have won at 2400 metres (~ miles) or longer. These include such thoroughbreds that also competed overseas as Tobin Bronze and Better Loosen Up.

Distance
 1955–1972 -  miles (~2000 metres)
 1973 onwards - 1600 metres

Grade
 1955–1979 - Principal Race
 1979 onwards - Group 2

Venue
In 2007 the race was run at Sandown Racecourse due to reconstruction of Flemington Racecourse.

Conditions
From 1955 to 1980 the race was run at Weight for Age.

Winners

 2022 - Inspirational Girl
 2021 - Star Of The Seas
 2020 - Fifty Stars
 2019 - Fifty Stars
 2018 - Humidor
 2017 - Palentino
 2016 - He Or She
 2015 - Suavito
 2014 - Lidari
 2013 - †Puissance De Lune / Budriguez
 2012 - Green Moon
 2011 - Whobegotyou
 2010 - Lord Tavistock
 2009 - Largo Lad
 2008 - The Fuzz
 2007 - Apache Cat
 2006 - Rosden
 2005 - Grey Song
 2004 - Gold Wells
 2003 - Walk On Air
 2002 - Tears Royal
 2001 - Market Price
 2000 - Oliver Twist
 1999 - Thackeray
 1998 - Willoughby
 1997 - Zuccherino
 1996 - Racer's Edge
 1995 - Durbridge
 1994 - Durbridge
 1993 - Prince Salieri
 1992 - Shiva's Revenge
 1991 - Better Loosen Up
 1990 - Better Loosen Up
 1989 - Vo Rogue
 1988 - Vo Rogue
 1987 - Playful Princess
 1986 - Lord Of Camelot
 1985 - Beechcraft
 1984 - Penny Edition
 1983 - Trissaro
 1982 - Kip
 1981 - Hyperno
 1980 - Hyperno
 1979 - Leonotis
 1978 - Opposition
 1977 - Surround
 1976 - Lord Dudley
 1975 - Zambari
 1974 - Sobar
 1973 - Gunsynd
 1972 - Surrender
 1971 - Gay Icarus
 1970 - Cyron
 1969 - Fileur
 1968 - Future
 1967 - Tobin Bronze
 1966 - Tobin Bronze
 1965 - Sir Dane
 1964 - Teppo Star
 1963 - Mamburdi
 1962 - Dhaulagiri
 1961 - Dhaulagiri
 1960 - Wool Man
 1959 - But Beautiful
 1958 - Sailor's Guide
 1957 - Sailor's Guide
 1956 - Rising Fast
 1955 - Prince Cortauld

† Dead heat

See also
 List of Australian Group races
 Group races

References

Horse races in Australia
Flemington Racecourse